Mingo Falls is a  high waterfall located in the Qualla Boundarya land trust of the Eastern Band of Cherokee Indiansnear the town of Cherokee, Swain County, North Carolina in the Blue Ridge Mountains of the eastern United States. The waterfall is among the tallest in the southern Appalachians.

Name
The official name of the falls originates from the Cherokee term Mingo which means Big Bear. The waterfall is also unofficially called Big Bear Falls.

Geography
Mingo Falls is located on Mingo Creek in the Lower Raven Fork watershed of the Blue Ridge Mountains, before it empties into the Oconaluftee River, in close proximity to the Blue Ridge Parkway and the east entrance to Great Smoky Mountains National Park. The nearest town is Cherokee in the Qualla Boundary land trust.

Trail
The Pigeon Creek Trail leads to Mingo Falls. The trailhead can be accessed from the National Park Service's Oconaluftee Visitor Center by driving south on US-441 toward the town of Cherokee, turning left at the second intersection onto Big Cove Road. Turn left again at the first stop sign and continue  to Mingo Falls Campground where the trail begins.

No permits are required to drive into the Qualla Boundary or to hike on the trail to Mingo Falls.

See also
 List of waterfalls of North Carolina

References

External links 

North Carolina waterfalls website
Video overview of Mingo Falls

Waterfalls of North Carolina